The 1991–92 Serie A season was the 58th season of the Serie A, the top level of ice hockey in Italy. 10 teams participated in the league, and HC Devils Milano won the championship by defeating HC Milan in the final.

Regular season

Playoffs

External links
 Season on hockeyarchives.info

1991–92 in Italian ice hockey
Serie A (ice hockey) seasons
Italy